The shell game (also known as thimblerig, three shells and a pea, the old army game) is often portrayed as a gambling game, but in reality, when a wager for money is made, it is almost always a confidence trick used to perpetrate fraud. In confidence trick slang, this swindle is referred to as a short-con because it is quick and easy to pull off. The shell game is related to the cups and balls conjuring trick, which is performed purely for entertainment purposes without any purported gambling element.

Play

In the shell game, three or more identical containers (which may be cups, shells, bottle caps, or anything else) are placed face-down on a surface. A small ball is placed beneath one of these containers so that it cannot be seen, and they are then shuffled by the operator in plain view. One or more players are invited to bet on which container holds the ball – typically, the operator offers to double the player's stake if they guess right. Where the game is played honestly, the operator can win if he shuffles the containers in a way which the player cannot follow.

In practice, however, the shell game is notorious for its use by confidence tricksters who will typically rig the game using sleight of hand to move or hide the ball during play and replace it as required. Fraudulent shell games are also known for the use of psychological tricks to convince potential players of the legitimacy of the game – for example, by using shills or by allowing a player to win a few times before beginning the scam.

History

The shell game dates back at least to Ancient Greece. It can be seen in several paintings of the European Middle Ages. A book published in England in 1670 (Hull Elections – Richard Perry and his fiddler wife) mentions the thimblerig game. In the 1790s, it was called "thimblerig" as it was originally played using sewing thimbles. Later, walnut shells were used, and today the use of bottle caps or matchboxes is common.

The swindle became very popular throughout the nineteenth century, and games were often set up in or around traveling fairs. A thimblerig team (comprising operator and confederates) was depicted in William Powell Frith's 1858 painting, The Derby Day.  In Frith's 1895, My Autobiography and Reminiscences the painter-turned-memorialist leaves an account of his encounter with a thimble-rig team (operator and accomplices):

Fear of jail and the need to find new "flats" (victims) kept these "sharps" (shell men or "operators") traveling from one town to the next, never staying in one place very long. One of the most infamous confidence men of the nineteenth century, Jefferson Randolph Smith, known as Soapy Smith, led organized gangs of shell men throughout the mid-western United States, and later in Alaska.

Today, the game is still being played for money in many major cities around the world, usually at locations with a high tourist concentration (for example: La Rambla in Barcelona, Gran Via in Madrid, Westminster Bridge in London, Kurfürstendamm in Berlin, Bahnhofsviertel in Frankfurt am Main and public spaces in Paris, Buenos Aires, Benidorm, New York City, Chicago,  and Los Angeles). The swindle is classified as a confidence trick game, and illegal to play for money in most countries.

The game also inspired a pricing game on the game show The Price Is Right, in which contestants attempt to win a larger prize by pricing smaller prizes to earn attempts at finding a ball hidden under one of four shells designed to resemble walnut shells.  While the ball is not shown during the game, and the host shuffles the shells before the start of the game, contestants can win by either winning all four attempts or winning enough attempts (via big "chips" to mark the shells), and picking the one that has the ball.  The shuffling is only allowed before the pricing part of the game begins, and once the first small prize is announced, no further shuffling is permitted.  Federal game show regulations are designed to ensure the game is legally a game that can be won.

See also
 Get-rich-quick scheme
 Three-card Monte
 Cups and balls routine

Bibliography
 Bishop, Glen, The Shellgame – For Tableside Tricksters, 2000 
 Price, Paul, The Real Work: Essential Sleight Of Hand For Street Operators, 2001 
 Whit Haydn and Chef Anton, Notes on Three-card Monte 
 Perry, Richard Hull Elections

Notes

External links
  How do big city shell games work?. How Stuff Works

Confidence tricks
Gambling in ancient history

fr:Bonneteau#Variantes